Frank Darr Jackson (January 26, 1854 – November 16, 1938) was the 15th governor of Iowa, serving one term from 1894 to 1896.

Biography 
Jackson attended Iowa Agricultural College (now Iowa State University) and the University of Iowa Law School.  He was admitted to the bar in 1875 and practiced law in Greene, Iowa.  From 1885 to 1891, he was Iowa Secretary of State.  He was elected governor as a Republican in 1893, defeating incumbent Horace Boies, but did not seek reelection after his single two-year term.  Jackson resumed his position as president of the Royal Union Life Insurance Company, and then retired to California, where he died in 1938.

References

External links 
"Honored by Iowa Democrats", The New York Times, September 5, 1893

1854 births
1938 deaths
American lawyers
Republican Party governors of Iowa
Iowa State University alumni
Secretaries of State of Iowa
University of Iowa College of Law alumni
People from Butler County, Iowa
People from Arcade, New York
19th-century American politicians